A Dónde Me Lleva La Vida is an album by La Renga, released in 1994. After the independently produced Esquivando Charcos the band published A Dónde Me Lleva La Vida in the same way in November 1993. Four months later, negotiations led to Polygram gaining production and image rights. The multinational is in charge of the distribution of the album and spent 25,000 dollars on the video for "El Rito de Los Corazones Sangrando". The album achieved platinum status in Argentina for selling over 60,000 copies.

Track listing

Personnel
Chizzo – lead vocals, lead guitar
Tete – bass guitar, backing vocals
Tanque – drums, percussion
Manu – saxophone
Chiflo – saxophone

Additional personnel
Augusto Milharcic – recording, mixing
Mario Breuer – mastering
Pablo Martinian – artwork
Adrián Mascari – A&R
Gabriel Goncalvez – manager

References

1994 albums
La Renga albums
Self-released albums